Fly honeysuckle is a common name for several plants and may refer to:
 Lonicera canadensis - American fly honeysuckle
 Lonicera oblongifolia – Swamp fly honeysuckle
 Lonicera utahensis - fly honeysuckle
 Lonicera villosa – Mountain fly honeysuckle
 Lonicera xylosteum - (European) fly honeysuckle, dwarf honeysuckle, fly woodbine
 Lonicera caerulea - (Blue) fly honeysuckle, blue honeysuckle, sweetberry honeysuckle